Modave is a municipality of Wallonia located in the province of Liège, Belgium. 

On January 1, 2006, Modave had a total population of 3,722. The total area is 40.37 km² which gives a population density of 92 inhabitants per km².

The municipality consists of the following districts: Modave, Outrelouxhe, Strée, and Vierset-Barse.

The Château des Comtes de Marchin or Modave Castle is situated near the village of Modave. Rennequin Sualem built here what became the model for the famous Machine de Marly, which he invented.

See also
 List of protected heritage sites in Modave

References

External links
 

Municipalities of Liège Province